Thomas Fountain Terrell (July 5, 1866 – October 28, 1939) was a Democratic politician from Idaho. He served as the seventh lieutenant governor of Idaho. Terrell was elected in 1901 along with Governor Frank W. Hunt.

He died in Minnesota in 1939 and he was buried in Idaho.

References

Idaho Democrats
Lieutenant Governors of Idaho
1866 births
1939 deaths